Stranger on the Loose (2003) is the second book by American author D. Harlan Wilson.  It contains twenty-seven irreal short stories and flash fiction as well as a novella, "Igsnay Bürdd the Animal Trainer."  Pieces in this collection originally appeared in magazines and journals such as Eclectica Magazine, The Dream People, Locus Novus, 3 A.M. Magazine, Jack Magazine, Diagram, Riverbabble and Redsine.  The book is illustrated by British storyboard artist Simon Duric.

2003 short story collections
Books by D. Harlan Wilson